Okra or Okro soup is prepared using the edible green seed pods of the okra flowering plant as a primary ingredient. Other vegetables can be added to the soup as well, such as ewedu, kerenkere, or Ugu leaf. Depending on the specific variant being prepared, okra soup can have a clear broth or be deep green in colour, much like the okra plant itself. Okra (and, by extension, okra soup) can have a slippery or "slimy" mouthfeel. The edible green seed pods can also be used in other stews and soups, such as the American dish gumbo.

Nigeria
In Nigeria, okra soup is a delicacy and is popular amongst Yorubas, Igbos, Efiks, Hausas, and other Nigerian ethnic groups. In Yoruba, it is referred to as obe lla .

China
Chinese okra soup is a "country style dish often served at family meals". Chinese okra differs significantly from the varieties of okra commonly available in the West.

Indonesia
In Indonesian cuisine, okra soup is called sayur oyong. It is usually served in clear chicken broth with rice vermicelli (bihun) or mung bean vermicelli (sohun), with slices of bakso (ground beef surimi).

Japan

United States
In the United States, the first recipe for okra soup was published in 1824 in the book The Virginia Housewife. After this initial publication, okra soup was commonly included in American cookbooks. In the late 1800s, okra soup recipes were commonly published in The New York Times. American okra soup can be prepared using canned, frozen, or fresh okra. It is a traditional soup in Savannah, Georgia and Charleston, South Carolina.

Gallery

See also 

 Gumbo
 List of soups
 List of vegetable soups

References

Further reading
  – Poor-Man's Okra Soup

External links 

Video: Nigerian Okra Soup
Video: Nigerian Okra Soup with Fresh Fish & Assorted Meat
Easy Nigerian Okra Soup Recipe

Vegetable soups
Igbo cuisine
African soups
Vegetable dishes of Indonesia
Yoruba cuisine
Okra dishes